Antonio Deon Tarver (born November 21, 1968) is an American former professional boxer and boxing commentator. In boxing he competed from 1997 to 2015, and held multiple light heavyweight world championships, including the WBA (Unified), WBC, IBF and Ring magazine titles, as well as the IBO light heavyweight and cruiserweight titles.

As an amateur, Tarver represented the United States at the 1996 Olympics, winning a bronze medal in the light heavyweight division; he eventually lost to Vassiliy Jirov from Kazakhstan, whom he had previously defeated at the 1995 World Championships to win gold. Tarver also triumphed at the 1995 Pan American Games and 1995 U.S. National Championships, winning gold in both. He remains the only boxer in history to have won gold at the Pan Am Games, World Championships and U.S. Nationals all in the same year.

Outside of boxing, Tarver starred as Mason "The Line" Dixon, the heavyweight champion in the 2006 film Rocky Balboa.

Amateur career
1993 and 1995 United States amateur Light Heavyweight champion.
1994 National Golden Gloves Light Heavyweight champion
Won the Light Heavyweight bronze medal for the United States at the 1996 Olympics in Atlanta.  His results were:
Defeated Dmitry Vybornov (Russia) 5–2
Defeated David Kowah (Sierra Leone) RSC 1 (2:43)
Defeated Enrique Flores (Puerto Rico) RSC 3 (1:54)
Lost to Vassiliy Jirov (Kazakhstan) 9–15

Professional career

Early years
Tarver made his professional debut at the age of 28 on February 18, 1997, with a second-round knockout of Joaquin Garcia at the legendary "Blue Horizon" in Philadelphia.

Tarver won his first 16 fights, 14 by knockout, before stepping up his level of competition. After taking most of his first 16 fights in either his native Florida or at the "Blue Horizon", for his 11th fight he met veteran Rocky Gannon in Chester, West Virginia, on August 30, 1998. Tarver knocked out Gannon in the second round.

On February 29, 2000, Tarver scored a knockout against Ernest M-16 Mateen in Las Vegas. Later that year, Tarver suffered his first loss when he was knocked down in the 11th round by Eric Harding, en route to a unanimous decision on June 23 in Biloxi, Mississippi. This was an IBF title elimination bout, where the winner would face Roy Jones Jr.

In 2002, Tarver defeated former two-weight world champion Reggie Johnson by split decision to win the NABF & USBA light-heavyweight titles, and a guaranteed title shot at Roy Jones. He then scored a fifth round stoppage over Harding in a rematch that was on the undercard of the rematch between Shane Mosely and Vernon Forrest. Tarver was trailing on the scorecards until the 4th round, when he sent Harding to the canvas with a barrage of unanswered power shots; Harding was also floored twice in the 5th round, leading to the stoppage.

Unified light heavyweight champion
On April 26, 2003, Tarver received his first world title shot, when he faced former WBC champion Montel Griffin for the WBC & IBF light-heavyweight titles that had been vacated by Roy Jones Jr., who had gone on to defeat John Ruiz for the WBA heavyweight title the previous month. After dropping Griffin in the first and last rounds, Tarver was crowned champion after winning a unanimous decision.

Tarver vs. Jones I, II

Next, rather than remain at heavyweight, Jones planned to return to light-heavyweight and regain his belts. Given little chance of winning, Tarver took a weight-drained Jones the distance and lost the fight and WBC title by a majority decision on November 8, 2003, in Las Vegas (Tarver had relinquished the IBF title a few days earlier in anticipation of being unable to make a mandatory defense.)

In a rematch on May 15, 2004, in Las Vegas, Tarver upset the odds to regain the WBC title and win the WBA (Super) title by knocking Jones out in the second round. In fifty previous fights, Jones had only been sent to the floor once, leaving most observers shocked at the result.

Rise in popularity
Tarver became a mainstream celebrity after his rematch win over Jones, making appearances at late-night shows, appearing on the cover of both Ring and KO Magazine, being spotted by television cameras as a spectator at various boxing fights, and co-hosting ESPN's "Friday Night Fights" for one telecast.

Tarver vs. Johnson I, II
Later in 2004, the WBC decided to strip Tarver of the world title after he decided against fighting their mandatory challenger, instead choosing to fight IBF title holder Glen Johnson December 18 in Temecula, California; Tarver had already been removed as Super Champion by the WBA in their July rankings. Johnson himself had been stripped of his IBF title before the bout with Tarver for not fighting his mandatory challenger. Both fighters were celebrated for their decision to fight each other rather than bow to the pressure from what has become known as "The Alphabet Soup" sanctioning bodies (WBC, WBA, WBO, and IBF).

Tarver, considered a favorite to win the fight, suffered an upset loss to Johnson by way of a split decision in a fight that he did not appear to be in top shape for. Tarver avenged the loss six months later with a unanimous decision, out-boxing and out-working the aggressive Johnson at the FedEx Forum in Memphis, Tennessee to regain The Ring championship.

Tarver vs. Jones III

In their third fight, Tarver won a unanimous decision over Roy Jones Jr. on October 1, 2005, in Tampa, Florida, almost knocking Jones down in the 11th round but also finding himself in trouble at times during the fight.

Tarver vs. Hopkins
On June 10, 2006, Tarver faced former undisputed world middleweight champion Bernard Hopkins for Tarver's The Ring title at The Boardwalk Hall in Atlantic City, New Jersey. Hopkins, a 3-to-1 underdog, dominated the fight, outboxing Tarver to win a unanimous decision.  The fight was scored 118–109 by all three judges.  Tarver was knocked down in the 5th round. Tarver's record would now stand at 24 wins and 4 losses, with 18 wins coming by way of knockout.

Return to the ring
Tarver returned to the ring nearly one year after his loss to Hopkins, defeating Albanian-fighter Elvir Muriqi on June 9, 2007, by way of a majority decision. In his next fight, held at Foxwoods Resort Casino on  December 1, 2007, Tarver registered a win over Danny Santiago by way of a 4th round TKO.

Tarver then regained the IBF title by outpointing Clinton Woods.

Tarver vs. Dawson I, II
On October 11, 2008, Tarver faced rising star Chad Dawson for Tarver's IBF title.  The fight took place at Palms Casino in Las Vegas.  Tarver lost the fight via unanimous decision, with wide margins of 118–109 and 117–110 (twice). The outcome was not disputed.

With the loss to Dawson, it was speculated that Tarver may choose to retire; however, he later announced that he and Dawson would meet in a rematch in March 2009.

A rematch with Dawson, originally announced for March 14, 2009, had to be postponed due to an injury suffered by Dawson. Finally, on May 9, the two fighters met at the Hard Rock Hotel and Casino, Las Vegas. Tarver, who came to the fight as a 5:1 underdog, again lost by unanimous decision.

Move up to heavyweight
Following the rematch loss to Dawson, Tarver took over a year off from the ring, before returning on 15 October 2010 to defeat Nagy Aguilera by 10 round unanimous decision in a bout that took place in the heavyweight division. For this fight Tarver officially weighed 221 lbs, some 46 lbs more than he had weighed for the Dawson rematch.

Cruiserweight
On 20 July 2011, Tarver took on Australian IBO cruiserweight champion Danny Green at the Sydney Entertainment Centre, Sydney, New South Wales, Australia, in Tarver's debut in the 200 lb cruiserweight division.

Tarver dominated the fight, knocking Green down in the second round and controlling the majority of the action from there on in. After taking heavy punishment and being saved by the bell at the end of round 9, Green failed to come out for the start of round 10, allowing Tarver to take the victory and the title by TKO.

Return
On February 25, 2021, it was announced that Tarver would be returning to the ring for the first time since 2015. He was signed to face former UFC Heavyweight Champion Frank Mir in Mir's boxing debut on April 17 on the undercard of Jake Paul vs. Ben Askren. Tarver intended to represent mental health advocacy and has said he would dedicate the bout with Mir  
to all survivors or victims of mental health disorders. However, On March 23, it was announced that Tarver had withdrawn from the bout after not being cleared by the Georgia Athletic & Entertainment Commission. He was replaced by former IBF cruiserweight champion Steve Cunningham.

Media

Rocky Balboa
Tarver starred as heavyweight champion Mason "The Line" Dixon in the 2006 film Rocky Balboa. In the film the current, unpopular, champion Dixon fights former champion Rocky Balboa, who decides to come out of retirement. Dixon wins the match by split decision, and after breaking his hand in the second round of the bout but still managing to stand toe to toe with Rocky for the full 10 rounds, proves to doubters that he has the heart of a champion. The DVD of the movie offers an alternate ending, in which Rocky wins the split decision.  Dixon's record before the fight is 33-0 (30 KO).
Also on the DVD, the film's writer and director Sylvester Stallone wanted to cast a real boxer in the role of Dixon, as he thought it would be easier to teach a boxer how to act than to teach an actor how to box convincingly. Tarver is one of only three fighters to actually defeat "Rocky Balboa" in film.

Commentating with Showtime
After his loss to Dawson in June 2009, Tarver served as a boxing analyst for Showtime Championship Boxing.

Professional boxing record

References

External links

Antonio Tarver profile at Premier Boxing Champions

1968 births
Living people
African-American boxers
American sportspeople in doping cases
Boxers from Florida
Cruiserweight boxers
Heavyweight boxers
National Golden Gloves champions
Boxers at the 1995 Pan American Games
Boxers at the 1996 Summer Olympics
Doping cases in boxing
Sportspeople from Orlando, Florida
Southpaw boxers
International Boxing Federation champions
International Boxing Organization champions
World Boxing Association champions
World Boxing Council champions
Winners of the United States Championship for amateur boxers
American male boxers
AIBA World Boxing Championships medalists
Medalists at the 1996 Summer Olympics
Pan American Games gold medalists for the United States
Olympic bronze medalists for the United States in boxing
The Ring (magazine) champions
World light-heavyweight boxing champions
Pan American Games medalists in boxing
Boxing commentators
Medalists at the 1995 Pan American Games